The National Hockey League (NHL) is a professional men's ice hockey league, founded in 1917. The NHL Board of Governors review and approve the relocation of any member club. Each team appoints an individual or individuals to represent their team on the Board of Governors. A majority vote is needed for relocation of a club. Clubs are considered permanently relocated when moved out of their respective home territories, which includes the city that they were located in, plus 50 miles from the city's corporate limits.

Under the constitution of the NHL, membership is on a partnership basis, each partner holding a franchise from the League for the operation of a hockey club in its designated city. The franchise can out-live teams located in different cities. For example, the Kansas City Scouts, Colorado Rockies, and New Jersey Devils are one franchise. A franchise's history includes the records of competition won in different cities, as differently-named teams. Naming and team logos and designs are registered with the league. Two current teams use the names of previous franchises – the Ottawa Senators and Winnipeg Jets. These franchises do not include the history of the previous franchises, but have used the original franchises' logos and jersey designs. The league considers the history of the current Ottawa Senators to not include the original Senators; the Jets' franchise history includes the Atlanta Thrashers' history, not the first Winnipeg Jets (now the Arizona Coyotes).

There are 19 defunct and relocated NHL teams. The Montreal Wanderers, original Ottawa Senators, and the Quebec Bulldogs had played in the NHA before joining the NHL; Quebec City joined the NHL two years later as the Athletics. The Pittsburgh Pirates played in the U.S. Amateur Hockey Association as the Pittsburgh Yellow Jackets before joining the NHL in 1925. The first NHL team to disband was the Montreal Wanderers, citing the lack of available players due to World War I. The first team to relocate was the Athletics, who relocated to Hamilton, Ontario, to become the Hamilton Tigers. The NHL president at the time, Frank Calder, stripped the franchise from owner Mike Quinn and sold it to a Hamilton-based company. Three franchises became defunct due to the Great Depression: the Philadelphia Quakers, the St. Louis Eagles, and the Montreal Maroons. During their time in the NHL, the Senators and Maroons both won the Stanley Cup championship multiple times, with four and two respectively. The Brooklyn Americans was the last team to become defunct in the NHL. The franchise formally ceased in 1946. The Americans' departure reduced the number of teams to six. This began what became known as the Original Six era of the NHL.

The Original Six era ended when the NHL expanded twofold in 1967. Two teams from the expansion—the California Golden Seals and the Minnesota North Stars—relocated to other cities. The Golden Seals moved to Cleveland after nine seasons in the San Francisco Bay Area to become the Cleveland Barons; this was the first time in four decades the NHL approved a franchise relocation. Two years later, after failed overtures towards merging with the Washington Capitals and the Vancouver Canucks, the Barons merged with the North Stars. The Barons are the only NHL team to merge operations with another one. The North Stars relocated to Dallas in 1993 to become the Stars.

After six additional expansion teams, the merger of the Cleveland Barons with the Minnesota North Stars, and the NHL–WHA merger, the league had expanded to 21 teams by 1979. Three of the four teams from the NHL–WHA merger relocated to other cities: the Quebec Nordiques, the original Winnipeg Jets, and the Hartford Whalers. The Nordiques became the Colorado Avalanche in 1995, while the Winnipeg Jets became the Phoenix Coyotes in 1996 and rebranded as the Arizona Coyotes in 2014, with the Hartford Whalers moving to North Carolina and becoming the Carolina Hurricanes in 1997. Out of the seven active relocated franchises in the NHL, two have not yet won the Stanley Cup championship: the Coyotes and the Jets (both teams have also never been to the Stanley Cup Finals).

Most of the metropolitan areas that have hosted relocated or defunct teams have been given another NHL team. Montreal, Quebec City and Atlanta all have two defunct or relocated teams with the Wanderers and Maroons, the Athletics and Nordiques, and the Flames and Thrashers, respectively. Philadelphia (Philadelphia Flyers), Pittsburgh (Pittsburgh Penguins), and St. Louis (St. Louis Blues) gained teams during the 1967 expansion. After losing the Americans, two more teams have been added into the New York metropolitan area: the New York Islanders in 1972 and the New Jersey Devils in 1982. Other former host-metropolitan areas of NHL teams that have been given another team include: San Francisco Bay Area (San Jose Sharks in 1991), Ottawa (current Ottawa Senators in 1992), Denver (Colorado Avalanche in 1995), Minneapolis – St. Paul (Minnesota Wild in 2000) and Winnipeg (current Jets in 2011).

Defunct and relocated teams

Notes
 This team was not affiliated with the Pittsburgh Pirates of Major League Baseball (MLB).
 This team is not affiliated with the present-day Ottawa Senators.
 The team was formerly known as the New York Americans (1925–1941), and was not affiliated with the Rangers, the Islanders, or the Devils. In addition, the Devils relocated from East Rutherford to Newark in 2007, while the Islanders relocated from Uniondale to Brooklyn in 2015 and returned on a part-time basis to Uniondale in 2018. However, the Devils and the Islanders have never relocated out of the New York metropolitan area.
 The team was formerly known as the California Seals (1967), Oakland Seals (1967–1970), and Bay Area Seals (1970).
 This team was not affiliated with the Colorado Rockies of MLB.
 This team is not affiliated with the present-day Winnipeg Jets.
 The Wanderers played four games during the  before becoming defunct; a further two games were defaulted before the club folded.
 The Senators were on hiatus during the  due to financial problems.
 The 2004–05 season was canceled due to the season lockout.

Map of defunct and relocated teams

Timeline

See also
History of the National Hockey League
History of organizational changes in the NHL
Potential National Hockey League expansion

References

Further reading

External links
 
 

 
Defunct teams
National Hockey League
National Hockey League
National Hockey League
National Hockey League